Igor Olegovich Lapshin (born August 8, 1963 in Minsk, Belarusian SSR) is a retired male triple jumper who represented the USSR. Best known for his 1988 Olympic silver medal, he also won the 1991 World Indoor Championships as well as one European Indoor title. In July 1988 Lapshin achieved a personal best jump of 17.69 metres, which puts him 21st in the all-time performers list.

Achievements

References

Soviet male triple jumpers
Olympic athletes of the Soviet Union
Olympic silver medalists for the Soviet Union
Athletes (track and field) at the 1988 Summer Olympics
Belarusian male triple jumpers
1963 births
Living people
Athletes from Minsk
European Athletics Championships medalists
World Athletics Championships athletes for Belarus
Olympic silver medalists in athletics (track and field)
Universiade medalists in athletics (track and field)
Universiade gold medalists for the Soviet Union
World Athletics Indoor Championships winners
Medalists at the 1988 Summer Olympics
Medalists at the 1989 Summer Universiade